The diocesan system of Roman Catholic church government in Colombia comprises thirteen ecclesiastical provinces each headed by an archbishop. The provinces are in turn subdivided into 52 dioceses and 13 archdioceses each headed by a bishop or an archbishop.

List of Dioceses

Ecclesiastical province of Barranquilla
Archdiocese of Barranquilla
Diocese of El Banco 
Diocese of Riohacha 
Diocese of Santa Marta 
Diocese of Valledupar

Ecclesiastical province of Bogotá
Archdiocese of Bogotá 
Diocese of Engativá 
Diocese of Facatativá 
Diocese of Fontibón 
Diocese of Girardot 
Diocese of Soacha 
Diocese of Zipaquirá

Ecclesiastical province of Bucaramanga
Archdiocese of Bucaramanga 
Diocese of Barrancabermeja 
Diocese of Málaga-Soatá 
Diocese of Socorro y San Gil 
Diocese of Vélez

Ecclesiastical province of Cali
Archdiocese of Cali 
Diocese of Buenaventura 
Diocese of Buga 
Diocese of Cartago 
Diocese of Palmira

Ecclesiastical province of Cartagena
Archdiocese of Cartagena 
Diocese of Magangué 
Diocese of Montelibano 
Diocese of Monteria 
Diocese of Sincelejo

Ecclesiastical province of Florencia
Archdiocese of Florencia
Diocese of Mocoa–Sibundoy  
Diocese of San Vicente del Caguán

Ecclesiastical province of Ibagué
Archdiocese of Ibagué 
Diocese of Espinal 
Diocese of Garzón 
Diocese of Líbano–Honda 
Diocese of Neiva

Ecclesiastical province of Manizales
Archdiocese of Manizales 
Diocese of Armenia 
Diocese of La Dorada-Guaduas 
Diocese of Pereira

Ecclesiastical province of Medellín
Archdiocese of Medellín 
Diocese of Caldas 
Diocese of Girardota 
Diocese of Jericó 
Diocese of Sonsón-Rionegro

Ecclesiastical province of Nueva Pamplona
Archdiocese of Nueva Pamplona 
Diocese of Arauca 
Diocese of Cúcuta 
Diocese of Ocaña 
Diocese of Tibú

Ecclesiastical province of Popayán
Archdiocese of Popayán 
Diocese of Ipiales 
Diocese of Pasto 
Diocese of Tumaco

Ecclesiastical province of Santa Fe de Antioquia
Archdiocese of Santa Fe de Antioquia
Diocese of Apartadó 
Diocese of Ismina-Tadó 
Diocese of Quibdó 
Diocese of Santa Rosa de Osos

Ecclesiastical province of Tunja
Archdiocese of Tunja 
Diocese of Chiquinquirá 
Diocese of Duitama-Sogamoso 
Diocese of Garagoa 
Diocese of Yopal

Ecclesiastical province of Villavicencio
Archdiocese of Villavicencio 
Diocese of Granada en Colombia
Diocese of San José del Guaviare

Apostolic Vicariates
Apostolic Vicariate of Guapi 
Apostolic Vicariate of Inírida 
Apostolic Vicariate of Leticia 
Apostolic Vicariate of Mitú 
Apostolic Vicariate of Puerto Carreño 
Apostolic Vicariate of Puerto Gaitán 
Apostolic Vicariate of Puerto Leguízamo-Solano 
Apostolic Vicariate of San Andrés y Providencia 
Apostolic Vicariate of Tierradentro 
Apostolic Vicariate of Trinidad
Military Ordinariate of Colombia

Defunct Circumscriptions
Roman Catholic Diocese of Jericó (first creation)
Roman Catholic Diocese of Tolima
Apostolic Vicariate of Caquetá
Apostolic Vicariate of Casanare 
Apostolic Vicariate of Goajira 
Apostolic Vicariate of San Vicente del Caguán (now diocese)
Apostolic Prefecture of Chocó
Apostolic Prefecture of Labateca
Apostolic Prefecture of Vichada
Intendencia Oriental y Llanos de San Martín

Gallery of Archdioceses

See also

Roman Catholicism in Colombia

External links 
GCatholic.org.

Colombia
Catholic dioceses